Jeong-hyo, also spelled Jung-hyo, is a Korean unisex given name. Its meaning differs based on the hanja used to write each syllable of the name.

Hanja
There are 75 hanja with the reading "jeong" and 24 hanja with the reading "hyo" on the South Korean government's official list of hanja which may be used in given names. Some ways of writing this name in hanja include:

 (곧을 정 godeul jeong, 효도 효 hyodo hyo): "chaste and filial"
 (바를 정 bareul jeong, 효도 효 hyodo hyo): "upright and filial"

People
People with this name include:
Princess Jeonghyo of Balhae (d. 792), who is buried at the Mausoleum of Princess Jeonghyo
Sinjong of Goryeo (1144–1204), posthumous name Jeonghyo, twentieth monarch of the Goryeo Dynasty
Ahn Junghyo (born 1941), South Korean male novelist
Lee Jung-hyo (born 1975), South Korean male football player

See also
List of Korean given names

References

Korean unisex given names